Trigonias (Greek: "triangular" (trigonos), "ias" [denotes possession]) is an extinct genus of rhinoceros from the late Eocene (Chadronian) some 35 million years ago of North America. Its front legs had five toes (as contrasted with three in modern rhinos), the fifth of which was vestigial.

Notes

References
Prothero, Donald R. 2005. The Evolution of North American Rhinoceroses. Cambridge University Press, Cambridge, 218 pp. 

Eocene rhinoceroses
Eocene odd-toed ungulates
Eocene mammals of North America
White River Fauna
Fossil taxa described in 1900